Leap (or An Léim) is a village in County Cork, Ireland, situated at the north end of Glandore Harbour, several miles inland from the seacoast. Leap is located on the N71 national secondary road which runs through West Cork from Cork city. It is in the parish of Kilmacabea which also includes Glandore village.

Name and history
The Irish name of the village, Léim Uí Dhonnabháin, means "O'Donovan's Leap" and is reputedly derived from the story of a chieftain called O'Donovan, who was pursued by English soldiers, but escaped them by jumping across a ravine on the western side of the village.

In 1684, Jeremiah O'Donovan (MP Baltimore), Lord of Clan Loughlin, obtained letters patent from Charles II of England. His extensive landholdings in the surrounding countryside were erected into the Manor of O'Donovan's Leap, or the Manor of the Leap.

Amenities
The village has four bars (of which two serve food and one which is a music venue) and a fast food diner. Connolly's of Leap has been a bar since 1810. The local anglican community is serviced by Leap Church. The village also has a furniture and hardware store, a petrol station/shop and a hairdresser and a beauty salon.

An amenity park was opened in 2021.

See also
 List of towns and villages in Ireland

References

Towns and villages in County Cork
O'Donovan family